The Constitutional Council in Chile will be tasked to draft a new constitution in 2023. The Constitutional Council will be selected by the citizens in an election on 7 May 2023.

Background 

The 2022 Chilean national plebiscite was held on 4 September 2022, in order to determine whether the public agreed with the text of a new Political Constitution of the Republic drawn up by the Constitutional Convention. It was commonly referred to as the "exit plebiscite" (plebiscito de salida).

The proposed constitution, which had faced "intense criticism that it was too long, too left-wing and too radical", was rejected by a margin of 62% to 38%.

Boric announced a new process for drafting a new constitution, with Al Jazeera writing, "Most Chileans and their politicians have agreed the constitution that dates from the dictatorship must change." Boric called on the heads of all political parties for a meeting on Monday, 5 September, to chart a path forward. As a result of the rejection, the incumbent 1980 Constitution will remain in force, with The Guardian writing that "Chile's future looks decidedly uncertain," and that, "Boric has expressed a willingness to repeat the constitutional process, but the basis for reform is still very much up for debate." Colombian president Gustavo Petro lamented the win of the rejection vote, considering that Chile had decided to "revive Augusto Pinochet".

The Economist considered that "common sense" had led Chileans to reject the proposed constitution, it also called the result a "blow" for the government of Gabriel Boric.

In the aftermath of the plebiscite the internal division that the Christian Democratic Party's official support for the "Approve" option had created resurfaced, with various calls for a renewed leadership, and some calling for the expulsion of members who had supported the "Reject" option.

Agreement for Chile 
Chilean lawmakers announced in December 2022 an agreement to begin drafting a new constitution, three months after a referendum overwhelmingly rejected a progressive first text to replace the 1980 constitution. It was named Agreement for Chile. It would be submitted for referendum in November or December in 2023, with mandatory public participation. It comes after Chileans voted in September 2022 voted against the proposal of a left-wing constitution, leading to President Gabriel Boric reshuffling his cabinet.

Senate President Alvaro Elizalde, announced; "Today a new path has opened to progress towards a Constitution born from democracy." Under this agreement, the advisors would be elected in April and the half of the experts would be appointed by parliamentary deputies and the other half by senators. The agreement also proposed a parity between men and women, participation from indigenous peoples and that the proposals would need to be approved by three-fifths of the advisors. Unlike the previous convention, there will be no quota of seats reserved for Indigenous peoples. The agreement would see the new constitution drafted over next year by a body of 50 so-called constitutional advisors elected by direct vote, based on a preliminary draft prepared by a commission of 24 experts. As per the agreement, an expert commission will also be formed, its 24 members to be chosen by Congress on behalf of the different pro-government and opposition groups.

The expert will work on a first draft from 6 March to 6 June. The Constitutional Council will then begin its work thirty days after its election, on 6 June 2023 and must deliver the draft Constitution five months later by 6 November. A mandatory referendum will then be held on 17 December 2023.

An bipartisan agreement was made for a new constitution. The Republican Party and the Party of the People did not participate in the agreement.

Elections and composition 

The elections to determine the seats of the 155 constituent conventions will be held in May 2023. The mandatory vote will take place, and must be equal numbers of men and women. A difference to its predecessor is that the indigenous people have no reserved seats.

References

2023 in Chile